Nandan Bal (born 1 September 1959) is an Indian tennis coach and former professional player. He has coached India in both the Davis Cup and Fed Cup since retiring as a player.

Bal, a right-handed player from Pune who represented India in two Davis Cup ties, was a singles silver medalist for India at the 1979 Universiade and also won a silver medal at the 1982 Asian Games, in the team event.

On his Davis Cup debut, against South Korea in the 1980 tournament, Bal had a singles win over Kim Choon-ho and partnered with Sashi Menon to a win in the doubles, before losing the deciding fifth singles rubber to Jeon Young-dai. His other Davis Cup appearance came against Thailand in 1983, with his contribution a win in the final reverse singles, to secure a 5–0 clean sweep of the tie.

See also
List of India Davis Cup team representatives

References

External links
 
 
 

1959 births
Living people
Indian male tennis players
Indian tennis coaches
Racket sportspeople from Pune
Universiade medalists in tennis
Universiade medalists for India
Medalists at the 1979 Summer Universiade
Asian Games medalists in tennis
Asian Games silver medalists for India
Medalists at the 1982 Asian Games
Tennis players at the 1982 Asian Games